Nicotiana forsteri (previously designated Nicotiana debneyi) is a species of wild tobacco in the family Solanaceae, native to Queensland, New South Wales, Lord Howe Island, and New Caledonia. It is a tetraploid.

References

forsteri
Flora of Queensland
Flora of New South Wales
Flora of Lord Howe Island
Flora of New Caledonia
Plants described in 1819